Seymour Lipton (6 November 1903 – 15 December 1986) was an American abstract expressionist sculptor. He was a member of the New York School who gained widespread recognition in the 1950s. He initially trained as a dentist but focused on sculpture from 1932. His early choices of medium changed from wood to lead and then to bronze, and he is best known for his work in metal. He made several technical innovations, including brazing nickel-silver rods onto sheets of Monel to create rust resistant forms.

His work is included in the Phillips Collection, the Albright–Knox Art Gallery and the Smithsonian American Art Museum.

Books
Dr. Lori Verderame wrote the definitive monograph on Seymour Lipton entitled Seymour Lipton: An American Sculptor in 1999 published by Hudson Hills Press and the Palmer Museum of Art, Penn State University. The book was based on the author's research conduction to complete her Ph.D. dissertation entitled Seymour Lipton: Themes of Nature in the 1950s The Pennsylvania State University, University Park, PA. 
Much of his art addresses the themes of flight, nature and war.

See also
Laureate public sculpture in Milwaukee, Wisconsin
The Empty Room public sculpture in The Governor Nelson A. Rockefeller Empire State Plaza Art Collection in Albany, New York

References

External links
The Grove Dictionary of Art (excerpt available online)
Seymour Lipton: Post War American in Three Dimensions by Dr. Lori Verderame

1903 births
1986 deaths
Abstract expressionist artists
20th-century American sculptors
20th-century American male artists
American male sculptors
Members of the American Academy of Arts and Letters